The Executive of the 7th Northern Ireland Assembly is yet to be appointed, following the 2022 election to the seventh Northern Ireland Assembly held on 5 May. The newly elected assembly will meet for the first time on 13 May, and may elect a First Minister and Deputy First Minister, as well as an executive.

Formation discussions
As leader of the largest party in the Assembly, Sinn Féin's Michelle O'Neill is expected by commentators to be the leading candidate for the First Minister office, with the party entitled to make the only nomination to the position. Her election would rely on the Democratic Unionist Party's agreement to sit on the executive, and serve in the Assembly, something which is in doubt since the party's previous First Minister Paul Givan resigned the post in February 2022, in protest over the Northern Ireland Protocol of the Brexit agreement, the implementation of which unionists have objected to.

Sir Jeffrey Donaldson, DUP leader and Member of Parliament for Lagan Valley secured an MLA position in the eponymous constituency, becoming the presumed choice for Deputy First Minister, but has since announced that the DUP leadership team would decide if he would take that seat, (and thus call a by-election for his Westminister seat), or appoint a proxy. On 12 May, the day before the first scheduled sitting day of the Assembly, Donaldson announced his decision to remain as an MP, and formally co-opted former MP for Belfast South and MLA for Belfast South, Emma Little-Pengelly, to take his seat in the Assembly.

The DUP refused to assent to the election of a Speaker, on 13 May and again on 30 May, in further protest to the Northern Ireland Protocol, so the Assembly could not continue to other business, including the appointment of a fresh Executive. The Speaker and incumbent ministers would continue in office in caretaker roles until the Assembly would meet again, or fresh elections are called by the Secretary of State for Northern Ireland.

7th Executive of Northern Ireland

See also 
 List of Northern Ireland Executives
 7th Northern Ireland Assembly

References

Northern Ireland Executive
Northern Ireland, Executive of the Northern Ireland Assembly 7th
Ministries of the Northern Ireland Assembly